Het Koninklijk Conservatorium means "The Royal Conservatory" in Dutch.
The title may refer to:

Royal Conservatory of The Hague
Koninklijk Conservatorium (Brussels)
Koninklijk Conservatorium (Ghent)